Ysgol Llanhari is a Welsh-medium school for 3-19 year olds situated in the village of Llanharry, Rhondda Cynon Taf, Wales.

History
Llanhari is one of the  Welsh medium secondary schools in the area, having opened in 1974. It followed Ysgol Gyfun Rhydfelen in leading the way in Welsh medium education in South Wales. In 1974, the school was located in the county of Mid Glamorgan and had a huge catchment area from Tonteg and Cardiff in the east, all the way to Porthcawl and Maesteg in the west. It became popular very quickly and grew in numbers, becoming oversubscribed. Within a few years, it was decided that South Glamorgan pupils would be educated in their own county and in 1978, Ysgol Gyfun Gymraeg Glantaf opened in Cardiff. On 6 June 2011, it was publicly announced that from 2012 the school would incorporate a primary unit and become a 3-18 school. On 3 September 2012, the Primary Unit was opened and the  school was formally designated a 3-18 school with the new name of Ysgol Llanhari. Mrs Catherine Webb is Assistant Head with responsibility for this unit.

Feeder schools

Llantrisant, Tonyrefail, Dolau and the primary section of Ysgol Llanhari are the current feeder schools to the secondary department at Llanhari. Before the opening of Ysgol Gyfun Gymraeg Llangynwyd in 2008, the following schools also fed Llanhari with pupils from the county of Bridgend: Ysgol Y Ferch o'r Sger, Ysgol Bro Ogwr, Ysgol Cynwyd Sant and Ysgol Gymraeg Cwm Garw. These pupils are now educated at Llangynwyd, within their own county.

Headteacher

To date, Ysgol Llanhari has been led by six heads. Mrs Meinir Thomas was appointed headteacher in September 2022. Until August 2022, Mrs Rhian Phillips was the headteacher at the school. She succeeded Mr Meirion Stephens, who served as head of Llanhari from January 2008. He was preceded by Miss T Anne Morris, who took over in 2003. Prior to this, Mr Peter Griffiths, father of Ioan Gruffudd, star of such films as Fantastic Four and Wilde served as head from 1989. The original head when the school opened in 1974 was Mr Merfyn Griffiths.

Until August 2022, Ms Meinir Thomas served as deputy headteacher, with Ms Catherine Webb, Mr Geoffrey Howell, Mrs Elen George and Mr Marc Evans serving as assistant head teachers.

Heads of Year

Until August 2022, Mrs Jenna Martin-Williams was responsible for Years 7 and 8. Miss Sian Morris was the Attainment Standards Leader for Years 9 and 10 and Mr Stephen Wilshaw was the Attainment Standards Leader for Years 11, 12 and 13.

Exam results
Examination results have consistently improved since 2008. In 2012, 75% of pupils attained grades A*-C in all A-Level subjects sat, and 97% were awarded grades A-E in all subjects. At GCSE, 74.2% of all grades awarded were A*-C and 74.6% of students attained the 5 A*-C benchmark.

Notable former/current pupils

Mererid Hopwood, poet and academic - first woman ever to win the chair at the National Eisteddfod of Wales
Manon Antoniazzi, Chief Executive and Clerk of the Senedd
Garnon Davies, actor (Hollyoaks)
Bethan Ellis Owen, actress (Pobol y Cwm)
Shelley Rees, actress (Pobol y Cwm)
Gareth Wyatt, Welsh international rugby player
Scott Gibbs, Welsh international rugby player
Guto Harri, former BBC Chief Political Correspondent, Communications Director for the Mayor of London's administration
Betsan Powys, journalist, and former head of BBC Radio Cymru
Rhys Williams, professional athlete, specialising in the 400 m hurdles
Aled Siôn Davies, Paralympian
Laura Prosser, Welsh International Rugby Player,  Cardiff Blues Rugby Player and CrossFit Athlete.
Gemma Hallett, Welsh International Rugby Player,  Cardiff Blues Rugby Player and Tech Entrepreneur.
Paul Amos, actor

References

Primary schools in Rhondda Cynon Taf
Secondary schools in Rhondda Cynon Taf
Llanhari